Ossining station is a commuter rail stop on the Metro-North Railroad's Hudson Line, located in  Ossining, New York. It is one of two express stations on that line south of Croton–Harmon, along with Tarrytown, that serve most trains, excluding peak hour trains to/from Poughkeepsie.

Near the station is a ferry dock which is used by the NY Waterway-operated ferry connection to Haverstraw, allowing Rockland County, New York commuters to use the Hudson Line as an alternative to the New Jersey Transit-operated lines across the Hudson River.

Just south of the station is a section of track which runs through the middle of Sing Sing Correctional Facility.

History

The Hudson River Railroad reached Ossining on September 29, 1849, opening the village up to industrial development along the waterfront and allowing farmers inland to ship their produce to the markets of New York City. Among the riverside industrial concerns benefiting from the railroad were the marble quarries at Sing Sing Prison, Benjamin Brandreth's pill factory (still extant a short distance up the river) and others. These businesses gradually supplanted the boat builders and docks that had occupied the riverfront in the early 19th century.

Originally the station building was at grade level. In 1914 the New York Central Railroad, which the Hudson River had long been merged into, built a new station, the current building, in the Renaissance Revival style. It was placed on metal stilts to allow Main Street to pass over the tracks, eliminating the grade crossing that had been part of the original station. Like the rest of the Hudson Line, the station became a Penn Central station once the NYC & Pennsylvania Railroads merged in 1968. Penn Central's continuous financial despair throughout the 1970s forced them to turn over their commuter service to the Metropolitan Transportation Authority. The station and the railroad were turned over to Conrail in 1976, and eventually became part of the MTA's Metro-North Railroad in 1983. In 2000, New York Waterways used the station as the eastern port for the Haverstraw–Ossining Pedestrian Ferry creating a link between the station and Central Rockland County.

Station layout
The station has two high-level island platforms each 10 cars long. Track 1 does not have electric power, and is used by diesel trains only.

In popular culture

Ossining station was visible in the background of certain commercials for Kaopectate used in 2009.

In the series premiere of AMC's Mad Men ("Smoke Gets in Your Eyes"), set in March 1960, Don Draper is seen disembarking the New York Central train at Ossining; this is the first indication that he lives in the area.

References

External links 

Ossining Metro-North Station (TheSubwayNut)

Metro-North Railroad stations in New York (state)
Former New York Central Railroad stations
Railway stations in Westchester County, New York
Renaissance Revival architecture in New York (state)
Railway stations in the United States opened in 1849
Ossining, New York
1849 establishments in New York (state)